Dmitri Valeryevich Yashin (born 25 April 1993) is a Russian football player who currently plays for Aktobe.

Club career
He made his professional debut in the Russian Professional Football League for FC Terek-2 Grozny on 22 July 2013 in a game against FC Olimpia Volgograd.

References

External links

1993 births
Living people
Russian footballers
Association football defenders
Russian expatriate footballers
Expatriate footballers in Belarus
Expatriate footballers in Armenia
Expatriate footballers in Kazakhstan
Belarusian Premier League players
Armenian Premier League players
FC Akhmat Grozny players
FC Sokol Saratov players
FC Oryol players
FC Baikal Irkutsk players
FC Krumkachy Minsk players
FC Gandzasar Kapan players
FC Luch Minsk (2012) players
FC Dnyapro Mogilev players
FC Torpedo-BelAZ Zhodino players
FC Aktobe players